Dhondi Champya - Ek Prem Katha is an Indian Marathi language movie. starring Bharat Jadhav and Vaibhav Mangale, Nikhil Chavan, Sayli Patil in the lead. directed by Dnyanesh Bhalekar. Releasing in theatres on 16 Dec 2022

Cast 

 Bharat Jadhav
 Vaibhav Mangle
 Nikhil Chavan
 Sayli Patil
 Sneha Raikar
 Shalaka Pawar
 Kamalakar Satpute
 Sayli Sudhakar
 Prashant Vichare
 Prabhakar More
 Samir Choughule
 Nandkishor Chaughule

References

External links 

 

2020s Marathi-language films